Gilbert Kwasi Agyei (born 10 January 1962) is a Ghanaian politician and a Diamond Winner. He served for the Akwatia constituency as member of the first parliament of the fourth republic in the Eastern Region of Ghana.

Early life and education 
Gilbert Kwasi Agyei was born on January, 10th 1962 in the Eastern Region. He attended Akwatia Technical Institute where he had his General Certificate of Education (GCE) Ordinary Level.

Politics 
Gilbert Kwasi Agyei was elected as member of first parliament of the fourth republic during the 1992 Ghanaian parliamentary election on the ticket of the National Democratic Congress, succeeded Lionel Kofi Ablordepey of United National Convention(UNC) who took the seat in 1979 parliament . He lost the seat to Mohammed Erzuah Siam of the National Democratic Congress in the 1996 Ghanaian general election. He polled 22,140 votes out of the 38,701 valid votes cast which represented 52.90% over his opponents Francis A. Y. Agyare-Bray of New Patriotic Party (NPP) who polled 12,815 votes which represented 30.60%, Ernest Kwame Ampofo of People's National Convention (PNC) who polled 2,240 votes whixh represented 5.30% and Joseph Kofi Asiedu of National Convention Party(NCP) who polled 1,506 votes which represented 3.60% of the share.

Career 
He is a former member of parliament from 7 January 1993 to 7 January 1997.

Personal life 
He is a Christian.

References 

1962 births
Ghanaian MPs 1993–1997
People from Eastern Region (Ghana)
National Democratic Congress (Ghana) politicians
Living people
Ghanaian Christians